Kinley is a village in the Canadian province of Saskatchewan within the Rural Municipality of Perdue No. 346 and Census Division No. 12. The village of Kinley is located about 55 km west of the City of Saskatoon on Highway 14, between the communities of Perdue 10 km west and Asquith 17 km east.

History 
Kinley incorporated as a village on January 7, 1909.

Demographics 

Government 
The Village of Kinley is governed by two Councillors, a Mayor and an Administrator.

Provincially the village is within the Rosetown-Elrose electoral district, whose current MLA is Jim Reiter of the Saskatchewan Party.

Federally the village is within the riding of Carlton Trail-Eagle Creek whose current MP is Kelly Block of the Conservative Party of Canada. The village's postal code is S0K 2E0 and its telephone exchange is (306) 237-###.

Education 
School aged children are bused from Kinley to the communities of Perdue or Asquith, both of which have kindergarten to grade 12 schools.

See also 
 List of communities in Saskatchewan
 Villages of Saskatchewan

References 

Villages in Saskatchewan
Perdue No. 346, Saskatchewan
Division No. 12, Saskatchewan